Talib may refer to:

 Talib, Shirak, Armenia
 Talib (name), an Arabic name
 An individual member of the Taliban, a political terrorist Islamist movement in Afghanistan

See also
 Taleb (disambiguation)
 Talibe, Arabic term for student
 Tehrik-i-Taliban Pakistan, the Pakistani equivalent of the Taliban